Latocamurus is an extinct monospecific genus of flat-nosed arthrodire placoderm from the Early Frasnian stage of the Late Devonian period, found at the Gogo Formation of Kimberley, Western Australia.

Phylogeny
Camuropiscis is a member of the family Camuropiscidae under the superfamily Incisoscutoidea, which belongs to the clade Coccosteomorphi, one of the two major clades within Eubrachythoraci. The cladogram below shows the phylogeny of Camuropiscis:

References

Camuropiscidae